Sean Patrick Wade (born 2 February 1966 in Wellington) is a long-distance runner from New Zealand, who represented his native country in the men's marathon at the 1996 Summer Olympics in Atlanta, Georgia. There he finished in 83rd place. Wade was also a member of the Kiwi team at the 1990 Commonwealth Games, where he ended up in 11th position in the men's steeplechase. Now representing the United States, Wade has competed continuously since his time as an elite open athlete. In 2016, he set several age group world records in masters' athletics.

Achievements

References

External links
 
 
 
 KenyanWay.com/Sean Wade's running group at Houston, TX

1966 births
Living people
New Zealand male long-distance runners
New Zealand male steeplechase runners
Athletes (track and field) at the 1990 Commonwealth Games
Athletes (track and field) at the 1996 Summer Olympics
Olympic athletes of New Zealand
Athletes from Wellington City
Commonwealth Games competitors for New Zealand